Provincial Highway 82 is an expressway, which begins in Dongshi Township, Chiayi County and ends in Shuishang Township, Chiayi County on National Highway No. 3.

Length
The total length is 33.959 km.

Exit List
The entire route is within Chiayi County.

{| class="plainrowheaders wikitable"
|-
!scope=col|City
!scope=col|Location
!scope=col|km
!scope=col|Mile
!scope=col|Exit
!scope=col|Name
!scope=col|Destinations
!scope=col|Notes
|-

Major Cities Along the Route
Puzi City
Taibao City
Chiayi City

Intersections with other Freeways and Expressways
National Highway No. 1 at Chiayi JCT. in Shuishang, Chiayi
National Highway No. 3 at Shuishang JCT in Shuishang, Chiayi

See also
 Highway system in Taiwan

References

http://www.thb.gov.tw/

Highways in Taiwan